Guntakal–Nandyal section connects  and  in the Indian state of Andhra Pradesh. It is administered under Guntakal railway division of South Central Railway zone, except the Nandyal railway station which is under Guntur railway division.

References 

Rail transport in Andhra Pradesh
Guntakal railway division
Transport in Guntakal